The first season of Under the Dome, an American science fiction mystery drama television series, premiered on CBS on June 24, 2013, and ended on September 16, 2013.

Based on the novel of the same name written by Stephen King, Under the Dome tells the story of the residents of the fictional small town of Chester's Mill, when a massive, transparent, indestructible dome suddenly cuts them off from the rest of the world. Military forces and the government positioned outside the barrier attempt to break it down, while the residents trapped inside must find their own ways to survive with diminishing resources and rising tensions. A small group of people inside the dome must also unravel complicated mysteries in order to figure out what the dome is, where it came from, and when (and if) it will go away.

The first season has a score of 72/100, based on 35 reviews, indicating "generally favorable reviews", on review aggregator website Metacritic. The season has a score of 81/100, based on 47 reviews, on film and TV review aggregator Rotten Tomatoes; the site's critical consensus for the season reads: "Under the Dome is an effective and engrossing horror/mystery with airtight plotting and great special effects."

The first season of Under the Dome aired in the United States on Mondays at 10:00 pm ET, where it received an average of 2.7/8 in the 18–49 demographic and 11.21 million viewers over its 13-episode run.

Season plot 
In the first season of Under the Dome, the residents of Chester's Mill must deal with the immediate aftermath when a massive, indestructible dome suddenly crashes down on the town, cutting them off from the rest of the world. Lives are lost, questions and uncertainty loom over the trapped townspeople, and, as they realize they might be stuck for a while, panic and chaos become the new normal. As the townspeople frantically try to find resources to stay alive, an opportunistic town councilman with malicious intent makes himself the de facto dictator over the town, while an unknown stranger causes secrets about the town to be revealed. As the season progresses, the characters start to learn more about the dome, including finding a mysterious egg that supposedly serves as the Dome's power source, and although every little piece of answer gives more insight into what's happening and why, every answer also causes many more questions.

Cast and characters 
The cast members portray characters that were mostly taken from the original novel, "although some have been combined and others have changed jobs."

Main 
 Mike Vogel as Dale 'Barbie' Barbara
 Rachelle Lefevre as Julia Shumway
 Natalie Martinez as Linda Esquivel
 Britt Robertson as Angie McAlister
 Alexander Koch as James 'Junior' Rennie
 Colin Ford as Joe McAlister
 Nicholas Strong as Phil Bushey
 Jolene Purdy as Dodee Weaver
 Aisha Hinds as Carolyn Hill
 Jeff Fahey as Sheriff Howard 'Duke' Perkins
 Dean Norris as James 'Big Jim' Rennie

Recurring 
 Samantha Mathis as Dr. Alice Calvert
 Mackenzie Lintz as Norrie Calvert-Hill
 Beth Broderick as Rose Twitchell
 Dale Raoul as Andrea Grinnell
 John Elvis as Ben Drake
 R. Keith Harris as Peter Shumway
 Kevin Sizemore as Paul Randolph
 Josh Carter as Eric 'Rusty' Denton
 Ned Bellamy as Reverend Lester Coggins 
 Leon Rippy as Ollie Dinsmore
 Joe Knezevich as Freddy Denton
 Andrew Vogel as Carter Thibodeau	 
 Crystal Martinez as Nurse Adams
 Megan Ketch as Harriet Arnold
 Natalie Zea as Maxine Seagrave
 Mare Winningham as Agatha Seagrave

Production 
Brian K. Vaughan and Stephen King served as executive producers along with Neal Baer, Justin Falvey, Darryl Frank, Jack Bender, Steven Spielberg, and Stacey Snider. Danish director Niels Arden Oplev produced and directed the pilot. Baer served as the showrunner for the series.

Days before the series premiere aired on U.S. television, the cast and executive producers of Under the Dome met in Wilmington, North Carolina on June 20, 2013 for an advance screening of the pilot episode. During the presentation event, the city's mayor, Bill Saffo, declared Monday, June 24, 2013 as "Dome Day", and awarded Stephen King a key to the city.

On June 24, 2013, the night of the series premiere, entertainment website Vulture published an article about the economics of Under the Dome; in order to bring the expensive production (an estimated $3 million per episode) to life, CBS had struck a deal with Amazon Video that would bring new episodes to the platform four days after they debuted on CBS. That deal, estimated at $750,000 for each episode, covered one quarter of each episode's estimated production cost. Additionally, the article says that foreign markets also played an important role in the financing, bringing in approximately $1.9 million, and with the North Carolina state tax credits the show earned for filming in the state, an estimated $400,000, meant CBS had already earned back the money they paid for each episode before the episodes even aired on TV. CBS president and CEO Leslie Moonves described the deals: "Combining Amazon with the international syndication deal makes Under the Dome profitable immediately".

Episodes

Reception

Critical reception 
The first season has a score of 72/100, based on 35 reviews, indicating "generally favorable reviews", on review aggregator website Metacritic. The season has a score of 81/100, based on 47 reviews, on film and TV review aggregator Rotten Tomatoes; the site's critical consensus for the season reads: "Under the Dome is an effective and engrossing horror/mystery with airtight plotting and great special effects."

Positive reviews included Tim Goodman of The Hollywood Reporter, who wrote that "the intriguing Stephen King adaption is filled with storytelling promise", Glenn Garvin of the Miami Herald, who wrote that "based on the pilot episode — with its taut script, strong performances and special effects that are impressive without being overwhelming — there’s hope that Under The Dome might measure up to its unsettling print progenitor", and Verne Gay of Newsday, who wrote that the show "looks like a summer winner". A negative review came from Matthew Gilbert of The Boston Globe, who wrote that "so much is working against Under the Dome, it’s hard to get genuinely excited. While the arrival of the dome is intriguing, the characters are not".

Ratings

References

External links 
 Under the Dome Season 1 Episode List on Internet Movie Database
 Under the Dome on CBS on The Futon Critic

2013 American television seasons
Season 1